VirtualLogix, Inc. provides real-time virtualization software and related development tools for embedded systems. The company was founded in 2002.
In September 2010, VirtualLogix was acquired by Red Bend Software.

Products

Real-time hypervisors
VirtualLogix's VLX Hypervisor provides concurrent support for rich operating systems like Linux and Windows, and in-house or commercial real-time operating systems on general purpose processors and DSPs.

VLX supports a variety of 32-bit/64-bit processors, single and multi-core processors, including processors from Intel, Texas Instruments, Freescale and ARM and Power architectures. VLX supports devices with and without memory management units and can take advantage of hardware virtualization and security support.

Virtualization enabled high availability
VirtualLogix's vHA is an add-on to VLX that provides high availability capability for embedded systems using virtualization and multi-core processors.

Development environment
VirtualLogix’s VLX Developer is an Eclipse-based graphical environment, which is used to configure, build, monitor and optimize VLX virtualized platforms.

Competitors
Today, their competitors include Trango's Virtual Processors, Open Kernel Labs's OKL4 and, to a lesser extent, open source hypervisors such as L4, XtratuM and Xen.

Notes
VirtualLogix was founded as Jaluna and rebranded as VirtualLogix in September 2006.

External links
 VirtualLogix homepage
  at LinuxDevices

Software companies based in California
Companies based in Sunnyvale, California
Software companies of the United States